Pisces II (Psc II) is a dwarf spheroidal galaxy situated in the Pisces constellation and discovered in 2010 in the data obtained by the Sloan Digital Sky Survey. The galaxy is located at the distance of about 180 kpc (kiloparsecs)
from the Sun. It is classified as a dwarf spheroidal galaxy (dSph) meaning that it has an elongated shape with the half-light radius of about 60 pc and ratio of the axis of about 5:3.

Pisces II is one of the smallest and faintest satellites of the Milky Way—its integrated luminosity is about 10,000 times that of the Sun (absolute magnitude of about −5), which corresponds to the luminosity of an average globular cluster. The stellar population of Pisces II consists mainly of moderately old stars formed 10–12 billion years ago.

In 2016, follow-up work on Pegasus III highlighted that both it and Pisces II lie relatively close to each other (within approximately 43 kpc) and share similar radial velocities in the Galactic standard of rest frame (note: this is not the same as the LSR). This suggests that these two satellite galaxies may actually be associated with one another, and there is also a possibility that there was an even closer passage about 1 billion years ago. However, further spectroscopic measurements are required to confirm their association.

Notes

References

Further reading

Dwarf spheroidal galaxies
Pisces (constellation)
Local Group
Milky Way Subgroup
?